The Eve V is a 2-1 detachable personal computer manufactured by Finnish technology company Eve-Tech, released on 4 December 2017.

The computer itself is notable for its status as the first computer developed, designed and manufactured in collaboration with the local community through crowdsourcing. Subsequently, it was successfully crowdfunded through Indiegogo. It was designed to compete with other 2-in-1 detachables like the Microsoft Surface Pro through a community effort, promising users no bloatware attached.

History 
According to the company's website, Eve-Tech was founded in December 2013. Their first product, prior to the V, was the Windows 8.1-based tablet computer Eve T1, which was announced on 2 December 2014 and released on 8 December.

Over the course of time, the V was developed in an open online community with more than 1,000 members collaborating globally with Eve-Tech. The computer was announced in October 2016 and a pre-order campaign was initiated on the crowdfunding platform Indiegogo one month later. The campaign went successfully, as the company achieved their funding goal in a matter of 4 minutes and sold out all 500 units.

Features

Hardware 
The Eve V shares some of its design features with those of other hybrid devices such as Microsoft Surface Pro. The device, however, features an aluminium body which is 0.89 cm thick. The large device comes with a base kit that includes a stylus pen and an Alcantara-covered keyboard and ships worldwide.

The device boasts a 12.3-inch, 2880x1920 Sharp IGZO liquid-crystal display with a 1:1500 contrast ratio and 400 nits brightness and an anti-reflective coating for visibility and clarity. Eve V runs an Intel Core m3, i5, or i7 (up to 3.6 GHz) processor with a 16 GB LPDDR3 RAM and a 512 GB solid-state drive, in the high-end version of the device. The device's kickstand can be extended from the back end to allow the V to stand in a variety of angles as adjusted.

Along the sides of Eve V are two USB 3.0 ports, two USB-C 3.1 ports, with one having Thunderbolt 3 connectivity. Furthermore, the device has a standard 3.5mm audio jack and a microSDXC reader. The battery is 48 Wh, with the developers claiming up to 12-hour active usage life. A fingerprint scanner is situated within the power button, located on the right-hand side, making it compatible with Windows Hello and a quadrophonic speaker system. A recent software update has caused Windows Hello to cease working and there does not appear to be any active progress being made to resolve the issue.

Software 

The Eve V is shipping with Windows 10 operating system across all devices globally. An upgrade to the Pro version of 10 is also available as an option.

Release 
The Eve V was released to the public on December 4, 2017.

Currently, it can only be purchased directly from Eve-Tech online, where it has been promoted by periodic flash sales. However, Eve-Tech has experienced difficulties fulfilling orders, drawing complaints from customers who have not seen orders or refunds delivered 18 months after purchase.

Reception 
Eve V received positive reviews from critics. Many noted, and even acclaimed, the collaboration between the community and Eve-Tech, as well as its range of I/O ports, hardware, inclusion of a smart keyboard and active pen, build quality and affordability. Many critics were impressed with its value; Upon comparison with the Surface Pro, the V was often favorably received.

Many diverse issues were noted by critics. This includes, but is not limited to, various issues with the keyboard, such as the backspace key — reading "oops!" instead of conventional design, connection issues and its Alcantara design, the speaker system, the flash sale purchase model and the use of Intel Y-series CPU's compared to the Surface Pro's U-series.

Whilst generally well received at launch, there has been widespread concern over Eve-Tech's ability to full fill its orders due to the long delays faced by many customers. As of fall 2021, not all orders from December 2017 have been delivered.

References 

2-in-1 PCs